Altitude Montreal is a 33-storey,   skyscraper in Montreal, Quebec, Canada. It is located at 1225 Robert-Bourassa Boulevard at the corner of Cathcart Street in Downtown Montreal, opposite Place Ville-Marie. This modern skyscraper was designed by some of the same architects who were behind the Louvre Pyramid. 

Altitude Montreal consists of luxury condominiums and offers hotel-style services to residents such as a pool, spa, fitness centre, lounge, restaurant, business centre, conference room, security, concierge service and a valet. This location also offers famed restaurants like Zibo and Moretti at its street level. 

As of 2021, it is the city's second tallest residential tower, as it was surpassed by L'Avenue upon its completion. Construction on the tower began on May 3, 2016 on what was previously a parking lot, and was topped out with the addition of the architectural tip in November.

Altitude Montreal was designed by architecture firm Jean-Pierre Lagacé Architects, Nicolet Chartrand Knoll are the structural engineers, Bouthillette Parizeau are the mechanical engineers, and interior design by Nicole Vekemans. The developer is Daca Group.

See also
List of tallest buildings in Montreal

References

External links
Official website

Skyscrapers in Montreal
Residential condominiums in Canada
Residential skyscrapers in Canada
Downtown Montreal